Ren Guixin is a female Chinese footballer who plays as a midfielder for Chinese Women's Super League Club Changchun Jiuyin Loans. China Central Television reported that a thigh injury ruled Ren out of the 2016 Olympics.

International goals

References

External links 
 
 Official page 

1988 births
Living people
Chinese women's footballers
China women's international footballers
2015 FIFA Women's World Cup players
People from Baotou
Footballers from Inner Mongolia
Women's association football midfielders
Footballers at the 2014 Asian Games
Footballers at the 2018 Asian Games
Asian Games silver medalists for China
Asian Games medalists in football
Medalists at the 2018 Asian Games
Changchun Zhuoyue players